Evers-Swindell is the surname of several prominent New Zealanders:
Caroline Evers-Swindell (now Caroline Meyer), Olympic rower
Georgina Evers-Swindell (now Georgina Earl), Olympic rower
Nico Evers-Swindell, actor